was a popular prime-time television detective series in Japan, which ran from 1976 to 1979 for a total of 132 episodes and three seasons, each with its own story arc. The lead star was Tetsuya Watari. The drama won popularity and was followed by Seibu Keisatsu.

Plot
Sergeant Raisuke Kuroiwa (Tetsuya Watari) and the Kuroiwa Force, a special Flying Squad-esque division of the Tokyo Metropolitan Police solves crimes and cracks down on their perpetrators.

Cast
Daitokai Tatakai no Hibi (31 episodes)

Tetsuya Watari as Raisuke Kuroiwa (Kuro-san)
Yujiro Ishihara as Takigawa Ryuta (Baku-san)
Akiko Nishina as Keiko Kuroiwa
Kei Satō as Yukio Fukamachi
Isao Tamagawa as Mitsuhiko Ishiki
Kaku Takashina as Yonezō Maruyama
Takehiko Ono as Tadashi Ouchi (Bousan)
Kōjirō Kusanagi as Goichi Takagi
Akira Terao as Akira Hidaka
Masaki Kanda as Kōji Kujō
Joe Shishido as Junichirō Matsukawa
Sei Hiraizumi as Akihiko Okubo
Hiroko Shino as Naoko Miura

Daitokai Part II (52 episodes)

Tetsuya Watari as Raisuke Kuroiwa (Kuro-san)
Yusaku Matsuda as Isao Tokuyoshi (Toku)
Kaku Takashina as Yonezō Maruyama
Masaki Kanda as Sōtarō Jin (episode 14-52)
Ryuta Mine as Gan Kamijō (Saru)
Gō Awazu as Haruo Hirahara (episode 1-13)
Takehiko Ono as Tadashi Ouchi (Bōsan)
Shunsuke Kariya as Hyōsuke Miyamoto (Benkei)
Asao Koike as Tsutomu Yoshioka
Akiko Nishina as Keiko Kuroiwa (episode 1-8,19)
Yūsuke Takita as Kiyosato Yamamoto
Kei Satō as Yukio Fukamachi
Yujiro Ishihara as Doctor Gorō Munakata
Mitsuko Oka as Nurse Kyōko Yoshino

Daitokai Part III (49 episodes)

Tetsuya Watari as Raisuke Kuroiwa (Kuro-san)
Akira Terao as Jiro Makino
Masato Hoshi as Isao Torada
Takehiko Ono as Tadashi Ouchi (Bō-san)
Kaku Takashina as Yonezō Maruyama
Ryuta Mine as Gan Kamijō
Shunsuke Kariya as Hyōsuke Miyamoto (Benkei)
Yujiro Ishihara as Doctor Gorō Munakata

Insert songs
Part II
"Hitori" by Tetsuya Watari.
Part III
"Higure Zaka" by Tetsuya Watari.

References

External links
 

Japanese drama television series
Japanese crime television series
1970s Japanese television series
Japanese detective television drama series
Tokyo Metropolitan Police Department in fiction
Japanese action television series